Marfa is a Maban language spoken in Chad. It is not a dialect of the Masalit language.

References

Maban languages
Languages of Chad